Captain Pirate is a 1952 American adventure film directed by Ralph Murphy and starring Louis Hayward. The swashbuckler was based on the 1931 Rafael Sabatini novel Captain Blood Returns. This was the final film directed by Murphy.

Plot
Captain Blood is pardoned by the Crown for his crimes against Spain on the Spanish Main. By 1690 he is living in the West Indies on his plantation where he practices medicine and is to be married to Isabella. His new life is put in danger when he is arrested on a piracy charge after somebody raids the island making him look guilty. To prove otherwise he has to sail again.

Cast
 Louis Hayward as Captain Peter Blood
 Patricia Medina as Dona Isabella
 John Sutton as Hilary Evans
 Charles Irwin as Angus McVickers
 Ted de Corsia as Captain Easterling
 Rex Evans as Governor Henry Carlyle
 Malú Gatica as Amanda
 George Givot as Tomas Velasquez
 Robert McNeeley as Manuelito
 Nina Koshetz as Madame Duval
 Lester Matthews as Col. Ramsey
 Sven Hugo Borg as Swede
 Sandro Giglio as Don Ramon

Production
Filming started August 7, 1951.

References

External links 
 
 
 
 

1952 films
American historical adventure films
Films based on British novels
Pirate films
American swashbuckler films
1950s action adventure films
1950s historical adventure films
Films scored by George Duning
Films directed by Ralph Murphy
Films set in the 1690s
American action adventure films
Columbia Pictures films
American sequel films
Color sequels of black-and-white films
1950s English-language films
1950s American films